San Marino competed at the 1980 Summer Olympics in Moscow, USSR. Sixteen competitors, all men, took part in ten events in five sports. In partial support of the American-led boycott of the 1980 Summer Olympics, San Marino competed under the Olympic Flag instead of its national flag.

Athletics

Men's 20 km Walk
 Stefano Casali
 Final — 1:49:21.3  (→ 24th place)

Cycling

Two cyclists represented San Marino in 1980.

Individual road race
 Maurizio Casadei
 Roberto Tomassini

Judo

Shooting

Weightlifting

References

External links
Official Olympic Reports

Nations at the 1980 Summer Olympics
1980
Summer Olympics